William J. Brown (died 1970) was an American architect based in Cedar Rapids in the U.S. state of Iowa.  He is also known by his full name, William Jay Brown.

William J. Brown studied architecture at the University of Illinois.   He worked for prominent architects in Chicago and New York including Holabird & Roche, Kenneth M. Murchison, and John Russell Pope.
He and his older brother Frederick G. Brown established the Brown Brothers architectural firm.  One of their first projects, in 1910, was the Knights of Pythias Hall, but in 1911 Frederick died.  William J. Brown stayed and supervised the completion of the Knights of Pythias Building in 1912.

He later was partner, along with Edward H. Healey, in the firm Brown and Healy / Brown and Healey, which was active in the 1950s.

The firm was later Brown, Healey, and Bock.  Yet later it was Brown, Healey, Stone and Sauer.

Works include:
Ausadie Building, 845 First Ave. SE, Cedar Rapids, IA, (Brown, William J.), NRHP-listed
Brown Apartments, 1234 4th Ave. SE, Cedar Rapids, IA, (Brown, William J.), NRHP-listed
St. James United Methodist Church (1952), 1430 Ellis Blvd NW, Cedar Rapids, Iowa, NRHP-listed
Franklin Middle School, a contributing building in NRHP-listed B Avenue NE Historic District, Cedar Rapids.
Asbury United Methodist (1959)
St. Paul's United Methodist, Education wing addition
First Presbyterian Church, Education wing addition
Kenwood Presbyterian Church
St. Michael's Episcopal Church
Grant Vocational High School (1915), 346 2nd Ave., SW, Cedar Rapids, Iowa
Consistory Building, Cedar Rapids, Iowa
the Memorial building and City Hall on Mays Island, Cedar Rapids?
Armstrong Hall and perhaps more buildings, in NRHP-listed Cornell College-Mount Vernon Historic District, at Cornell College in Mt. Vernon, Iowa

References

Architects from Iowa
1970 deaths
Year of birth missing